De Horst is the name of several places in the Netherlands:

De Horst, Berg en Dal, a village in Gelderland
De Horst, Drenthe, a hamlet in Drenthe